Finchum is a surname. Notable people with the surname include:

 Chad Finchum (born 1994), American professional stock car racing driver
 Thomas Finchum (born 1989), American country musician and platform diver

See also
 Fincham (surname)
 Finchem